Cidinho may refer to:
 Cidinho and Doca, Brazilian rap duo
 Cidinho (footballer), Brazilian footballer